Roger Nikanor Haitengi (born 12 September 1983) is a Namibian athlete specialising in the triple jump. He won his first major medal, a bronze, at the 2014 African Championships.

His personal best in the event is 16.74 metres, set in Windhoek in 2010. This is the current national record.

Competition record

References

1983 births
Living people
Namibian triple jumpers
Male triple jumpers
Namibian male athletes
Athletes (track and field) at the 2015 African Games
Athletes (track and field) at the 2019 African Games
Commonwealth Games competitors for Namibia
Athletes (track and field) at the 2018 Commonwealth Games
African Games competitors for Namibia